Ponsacco is a comune (municipality) in the Province of Pisa in the Italian region Tuscany, located about  southwest of Florence and about  southeast of Pisa.

Geography
The municipality of Ponsacco contains the frazioni (subdivisions, mainly villages and hamlets) Camugliano, Le Melorie and Val di Cava.

Ponsacco borders the following municipalities: Capannoli, Casciana Terme Lari, Pontedera.

Twin towns
 Brignais, France
 Nanoro, Burkina Faso
 Treuchtlingen, Germany
 Agounit, Western Sahara

References

External links
 Official website

Cities and towns in Tuscany